Hydrazine nitrate is an inorganic compound with the chemical formula . It has usage in liquid explosives as an oxidizer. It exists in two crystalline forms, stable α-type and unstable β-type. The former is usually used in explosives. Its solubility is small in alcohols but
large in water and hydrazine. It has strong hygroscopicity, only slightly lower than ammonium nitrate.

Hydrazine nitrate has a good thermal stability. Its weight loss rate at 100 °C is slower than that of ammonium nitrate. Its explosion point is 307 °C (50% detonation) and explosion heat is about 3.829 MJ/kg. Because it has no carbon elements, the detonation products are not solid and their average molecular weight is small.

Production
Hydrazine nitrate is produced by the reaction of hydrazine and nitric acid:
N2H4 + HNO3 → N2H5NO3

References

Nitrates
Hydrazinium compounds
Oxidizing agents